Chef de brigade was a military rank in the French Royal Artillery and in the revolutionary French armies.

Before the revolution

Chef de brigade was equivalent to major in the French Royal Corps of Artillery. Each regiment of artillery was divided into two battalions, each of two brigades under the command of a chef de brigade. This rank was given to the best of the Capitaines en premier (first captains) in a regiment, commanding an artillery brigade that would be able to support an army division.

During and after the revolution
Chef de brigade was equivalent to colonel, in the French Revolutionary army, in command of a demi-brigade.  Both that unit (replacing a regiment) and that rank (replacing the rank of mestre de camp) were created at the same time, in 1793.  The two designations disappeared just before the institution of the French Empire, in 1803, with the old designations restored.

References

Military ranks of France
1793 establishments in France
French Revolutionary Wars